Aakash is a 2005 Indian Kannada language romantic drama film directed by Mahesh Babu, written by Janardhana Maharshi and produced by Parvathamma Rajkumar. The film stars Puneeth Rajkumar and Ramya in the lead roles, while Ashish Vidyarthi and Avinash play pivotal roles. 

At the Karnataka State Film Awards, the film won the Best Editor award for S. Manohar.

Plot 
Aakash (Puneeth) is a young man who bears a lot of responsibilities over his shoulder. He works in various fields as a driving instructor, swimming trainer and video cameraman to earn his living and take care of his young sister (Ashitha). He works on the principle of "stretch your leg as limit as your bed"!. He meets Nandini (Ramya), the daughter of a rich business man (Avinash) and develops a liking towards her but does not reveal it to her due to his practical belief that he cannot marry a rich girl. But Nandini falls for Aakash after knowing him better. However, this irks Nandini's brother (Kishore), who begins to play fowl in Aakash's personal life.  Aakash's sister engagement gets cancelled, and also he loses his job due to the influence of Nandini's brother. The rest of the plot describes the struggles faced by Aakash and the steps he takes to win over them.

Cast

Soundtrack 

R. P. Patnaik composed the film's background score and music for its soundtrack. The album consists of seven tracks. Lyrics for the 5 tracks were penned by K. Kalyan. And other 2 tracks, "Habba Habba" and "Hodi Hodi" penned by Sri Ranga and V. Nagendra Prasad respectively. The songs "Neene Neene" and "Aaha Entha Aa Kshana" became popular upon the audio release.

Reception 
A critic from Sify wrote that "Akash is a clean family entertainer from the home production of Dr Rajkumar, the icon of Kannada cinema. Compared to his earlier four films, Puneeth Rajkumar has worked hard in this love story which has a message for the youth of today". A critic from Rediff.com wrote that "Akash is certainly an enjoyable film. Puneet's performance and Ramya's glamourous screen presence will remain in your memory for a long time".

Box office 
Sify wrote, "This will be Puneeth’s biggest hit as in Mysore, Bangalore and Hubli, Akash is getting 95 percent collections right from the day of its release. Puneeth is a happy man and is surprised at the collection figures. Meanwhile Aptha Mithra collections have come down as two films Akash and Chandramukhi is taking over." The film ran for more than two-hundred days.

References

External links
 

2000s Kannada-language films
2005 films
Indian romantic drama films
Indian romantic action films
Films set in Bangalore
Films shot in Bangalore
Films scored by R. P. Patnaik
Films shot in Switzerland
Films directed by Mahesh Babu (director)